Camilla Dufour Crosland (born Camilla Dufour Toulmin, also known as Mrs. Newton Crosland, 1812–1895) was an English writer of fiction, poetry, essays and sketches. She also translated some plays and poetry by Victor Hugo.

Life
She was born on 9 June 1812 at Aldermanbury, London, where her father, William Toulmin, practised as a solicitor; her grandfather, Dr William Toulmin, was a physician of repute. She was a precocious girl, who could read at the age of three and loved reading, although she lacked a systematic education. She had two half-brothers by her father's first marriage and a younger brother by his second. Her father, who had money troubles, died when Camilla was eight, and his widow and daughter were not provided for.

Camilla Toulmin first appeared in print in 1838, with verse contributions to the Book of Beauty. She was also involved in editorial work, for the annuals The Keepsake, on behalf of Marguerite Power, and Friendship's Offering, as deputy to Leitch Ritchie.

Crosland was acquainted with numerous literary women, who included Mary Cowden Clarke, Mary Howitt, Mary Russell Mitford, Geraldine Jewsbury, Catherine Crowe, Lady Blessington and Frances Browne. She was especially close to Dinah Mulock, later Craik, who acted as her bridesmaid on 22 July 1848, when she married Newton Crosland, a London wine merchant with literary and scientific tastes. Crosland and her husband became interested in spiritualism in 1854 and discussed it in 1857 with the Brownings in Italy.

After living for nearly 38 years in Blackheath, Camilla Crosland moved in 1886 to 29 Ondine Road, East Dulwich, where she died on 16 February 1895. A memorial window has been placed to her memory in St Alban's Cathedral.

Works
Crosland contributed work in many genres – poems, stories illustrating the condition of the poor, essays, and biographical and historical sketches – to periodicals such as The People's Journal, The London Journal, Bentley's Miscellany, the Old Monthly Magazine, The Illustrated London News, Douglas Jerrold's Magazine, Ainsworth's Magazine, and to annuals. For more than 50 years she was a regular contributor to Chambers's Journal, and at the time of her death she was its writer of longest standing.

Crosland published Light in the Valley: My Experiences of Spiritualism (1857), which has been described as a "credulous record" and was received badly by the public. In 1865 she published a three-volume novel, Mrs. Blake; in 1871 the Diamond Wedding, and other Poems; and in 1873 a second novel, Hubert Freeth's Prosperity. Among her later productions were translations of Victor Hugo's plays, Hernani and Ruy Blas, with some of his poems, which appeared in Bohn's Library. In 1893 came her final work, Landmarks of a Literary Life, which is feminist in tone. Her husband's autobiography, Rambles Round My Life (1898) includes some extracts from her autobiographical writings that had remained in manuscript.

She wrote also:

Lays and Legends illustrative of English Life (with engravings), 1845
Poems, 1846
Partners for Life: a Christmas Story, 1847
Stratagems: a Story for Young People, 1849
Toil and Trial: a Story of London Life, 1849
Lydia: a Woman's Book, 1852
Stray Leaves from Shady Places, 1852
English Tales and Sketches (published in America in 1853)
Memorable Women, 1854
Hildred, the Daughter, 1855
The Island of the Rainbow, 1865
Stories of the City of London, retold for Youthful Readers, 1880

Notes

Attribution

External links

Whereabouts of Camilla Dufour Crosland's posthumous papers: Retrieved 8 November 2015

1812 births
1895 deaths
19th-century English women writers
19th-century English writers
English spiritualists
People from the City of London
Writers from London